ERAS may refer to:
Eras, a sans-serif typeface
Electronic Residency Application Service, in the United States
Committee for a Radical Left Rally, a political organisation in the Republic of Cyprus
Enhanced Recovery After Surgery, a set bundle of evidence-based practices to improve the outcomes of surgical patients

See also 
 ERA (disambiguation)